Stompin' Tom's Canada is a Canadian music and documentary television series which aired on CBC Television from 1974 to 1975.

Premise
This series featured Stompin' Tom Connors on tour throughout Canada with a mix of studio and location scenes. Connors' performances were combined with location segments featuring the various communities he visited. Regulars of this Edmonton-produced series included Gary Empey and Bill Lewis.

Scheduling
This half-hour series was broadcast on Thursdays at 9:00 p.m. (Eastern) from 26 September 1974 to 13 March 1975.

References

External links
 
 

CBC Television original programming
1974 Canadian television series debuts
1975 Canadian television series endings
Television shows filmed in Edmonton
1970s Canadian music television series